was a Japanese photographer.

References

Japanese photographers
1883 births
1968 deaths